Gheorghe Lucian Solomie (born March 5, 1969 in Beiuș) is a former Romanian rugby union player. He played as a wing. In 1995 he was the first rugby union player of UVT Timișoara to be called for a World Cup.

Club career
He mostly played for UVT Timișoara and also in France for Grenoble and Aurillac.

International career
Solomie had 50 caps for Romania, from 1992 to 2001. He scored 13 tries during his international career, 65 points on aggregate. He was a member of his national side for the 1995 Rugby World Cup and 1999 Rugby World Cup.

References

External links

1969 births
Living people
Romanian rugby union players
Romania international rugby union players
Rugby union wings
SCM Rugby Timișoara players
FC Grenoble players
People from Beiuș